The year 1707 in architecture involved some significant events.

Events
Johann Dientzenhofer takes over building work on Banz Abbey, following the death of his brother Leonhard Dientzenhofer.

Buildings and structures

Buildings

 In Istanbul, the Yeni Valide Mosque is begun (completed in 1710).
 The first Petrine Baroque building in Moscow, the Menshikov Tower (church), designed by Ivan Zarudny, is structurally complete.
 The Kollegienkirche, Salzburg, designed by Johann Bernhard Fischer von Erlach, is dedicated.
 In Paris, the Hôtel de Vendôme, designed for the Carthusians by Jean-Baptiste Alexandre Le Blond, is completed.
 In Beijing, construction of the Old Summer Palace (圆明园, Yuánmíngyuán, "Gardens of Perfect Brightness") begins.

Births
Giuseppe Bonici, Maltese architect and military engineer (died 1779)
Francesco Ottavio Magnocavalli, Italian architect (died 1789)
Johann George Schmidt, German baroque architect working in Dresden (died 1774)

Deaths
November 26 – Leonhard Dientzenhofer, German builder and architect (born 1660)

architecture
Years in architecture
18th-century architecture